Séréré  is a rural commune of the Cercle of Gourma-Rharous in the Tombouctou Region of Mali. The administrative center (chef-lieu) is the village of Madiakoye.

References

External links
.

Communes of Tombouctou Region